Hilda Carolyn Gurney (born September 10, 1943) is an American equestrian. She was born in Los Angeles. She won a bronze medal in team dressage at the 1976 Summer Olympics in Montreal. She participated at the 1984 Summer Olympics in Los Angeles, where the US dressage team placed sixth.

References

External links

1943 births
Living people
Sportspeople from Los Angeles
American female equestrians
American dressage riders
Olympic bronze medalists for the United States in equestrian
Equestrians at the 1976 Summer Olympics
Equestrians at the 1984 Summer Olympics
Medalists at the 1976 Summer Olympics
Pan American Games medalists in equestrian
Pan American Games gold medalists for the United States
Pan American Games silver medalists for the United States
Equestrians at the 1983 Pan American Games
Medalists at the 1983 Pan American Games
21st-century American women
20th-century American women